Marvin Merritt IV (born August 26, 1998) is an American actor and theater professional from Deer Isle, Maine. He co-founded ISLE Theater Company and currently serves as the Artistic & Executive Director.

He has trained internationally at the London Academy of Music and Dramatic Art, AST National Academy of Theatre Arts in Kraków, and the Moscow Art Theatre School. He graduated from Harvard University with a B.A. in Theater, Dance & Media in 2020.

As an actor, he has collaborated with Opera House Arts at the Stonington Opera House in The Tempest and the Maine-premiere of Shakespeare in Love, The Goat Exchange in WOYZECK/GALILEO, and Witness Relocation in The One You Feed. He also acted in the short film Last Rites and in Apocalypse Society alongside Alexandra Astin and Ben Ubiñas.

References 

1998 births
Living people
Harvard College alumni
21st-century American male actors
People from Deer Isle, Maine